"Stuck" is the fourth single by Caro Emerald taken from the album Deleted Scenes from the Cutting Room Floor. It was released on 15 October 2010 as a Digital download in the Netherlands. The single was certified gold by the Federation of the Italian Music Industry, denoting digital sales in excess of 15,000 copies in Italy.

Music video
A music video to accompany the release of "Stuck" was first released onto YouTube on 26 October 2010.

Track listing 
Stuck – EP
 "Stuck" (Radio Mix) – 3:51
 "Stuck" (KiNK Remix) – 6:15
 "Stuck" (KiNK Remix) [Radio Edit] – 3:54
 "Stuck" (Radio Mix) [Instrumental] – 3:52
 "Stuck" (Radio Mix) [Acapella] - 3:25

Stuck Deluxe - EP
 "Stuck" (Radio Mix) - 3:52
 "Stuck" - 4:29
 "Stuck" (Live @ Edison Awards 2010) - 3:9
 "Stuck" (Live @ North Sea Jazz 2010) - 7:04
 "Stuck" (KiNK Mix) [Radio Edit] - 3:55
 "Stuck" (KiNK Mix) [Original] - 6:17

Chart performance

Weekly charts

Year-end charts

Certifications

Release history

References 

2010 singles
English-language Dutch songs
Caro Emerald songs
Songs written by David Schreurs
2009 songs
Songs written by Vincent DeGiorgio